Pinwheel Galaxy may refer to:

 Messier 101, a galaxy referred to as the Pinwheel Galaxy
 Messier 83, a galaxy referred to as the Southern Pinwheel Galaxy
 Triangulum Galaxy (Messier 33), a galaxy sometimes referred to as the Pinwheel Galaxy
 Messier 99, a galaxy also referred to as the Coma Pinwheel Galaxy

See also
 Pinwheel nebula